Margaret Wright ( Shuttleworth, 8 November 1939 – June 2022), better known as Meg Wynn Owen, was a British actress known for her role as Hazel Bellamy in Upstairs, Downstairs. She also appeared in Gosford Park, Love Actually, Pride & Prejudice, Irina Palm, The Duellists and A Woman of Substance.

Early life

Wynn Owen was born Margaret Shuttleworth on 8 November 1939 in Lancaster, daughter of Margaret (nee Brinnand) and Miles Shuttleworth. When she was 13, she moved to Hoyland to live with her mother's friend Ruth Wynn Owen, who was a drama coach and actor, and her husband Ian Danby. After graduating from the Royal Academy of Dramatic Art (RADA) in 1956, she used her professional name, Meg Wynn Owen.

Personal life and death
Wynn Owen was married to Australian artist William Wright from 1967 to 1987. In later life she suffered from dementia, before dying in June 2022, at the age of 82. In November 2022, it was reported that her friend Brian Malam, who had been named as her power of attorney, pleaded guilty to fraud for stealing £65,000 from her bank accounts, and was sentenced to 32 months in prison.

Filmography (selected)

Films

Television

Theatre

References

External links
Meg Wynn Owen(Aveleyman)

1939 births
2022 deaths
20th-century Welsh actresses
21st-century Welsh actresses
Welsh film actresses
Welsh stage actresses
Welsh television actresses
People from Lancaster, Lancashire
English people of Welsh descent